Sapho is a lost 1913 silent film feature drama directed by Lucius Henderson and is based on the novel by Alphonse Daudet and Adolphe Belot. It stars stage actress Florence Roberts and Shelley Hull. It was produced by the Majestic Motion Picture Company and released by World's Special Films. As with Queen Elizabeth(1912) and Resurrection(1912), the film was one of the first features to star a major actress known by name. It competed with a four-reel French film that same year, 1913.

Sapho as a play, written by Clyde Fitch, was produced by Olga Nethersole on Broadway in 1900 to acclaim but also tinged with scandal as the play ran afoul of the New York Police Department, who shut it down for a time and arrested its stars Olga Nethersole and Hamilton Revelle.

The play was next filmed in 1917 as Sapho starring Pauline Frederick.

Cast
 Florence Roberts - Fanny Le Grand/Sapho
 Shelley Hull - Jean
 Arthur Cadwell Jr. - Joseph
 Lamar Johnstone - *uncredited

References

External links
 Sapho at IMDb.com
 Film Ad
 2nd Film Ad

1913 films
American silent feature films
Lost American films
Films based on French novels
Films based on works by Alphonse Daudet
American black-and-white films
Silent American drama films
1913 drama films
1913 lost films
Lost drama films
1910s American films